Frederick Andrews Blaney (17 March 1918 in County Antrim – 2 February 1988 in County Down) was an Irish cricketer. A right-handed batsman, he played just once for Ireland, a first-class match against Scotland in June 1939.

References
CricketEurope Stats Zone profile
Cricket Archive profile
Cricinfo profile

Blaney,Frederick
Blaney,Frederick
Blaney,Frederick
Sportspeople from Lisburn
Cricketers from Northern Ireland